The Men's Cathay Pacific Hong Kong Open 2015 is the men's edition of the 2015 Hong Kong Open, which is a PSA World Series event Platinum (prize money: $150,000). The event took place in Hong Kong from 1 December to 6 December. Mohamed El Shorbagy won his second Hong Kong Open trophy, beating Cameron Pilley in the final.

Prize money and ranking points
For 2015, the prize purse was $150,000. The prize money and points breakdown is as follows:

Seeds

Draw and results

See also
Hong Kong Open (squash)
2015 Men's World Open Squash Championship
2015–16 PSA World Series

References

Squash tournaments in Hong Kong
Men's Hong Kong Open (squash)
Men's Hong Kong Open (squash)